Dinggyê is a village and township in Dinggyê County, in the Shigatse prefecture-level city of the Tibet Autonomous Region of China. At the time of the 2010 census, the town had a population of 1,586. , it had six villages under its administration.

References

External links

Township-level divisions of Tibet
Populated places in Shigatse